In general linguistics, a labile verb (or ergative verb) is a verb that undergoes causative alternation; it can be used both transitively and intransitively, with the requirement that the direct object of its transitive use corresponds to the subject of its intransitive use, as in "I ring the bell" and "The bell rings." Labile verbs are a prominent feature of English, but they also occur in many other languages.

Terminology
The terminology in general linguistics is not stable yet. Labile verbs can also be called "S=O-ambitransitive" (following R.M.W. Dixon's usage), or "ergative", following Lyons's influential textbook from 1968. However, the term "ergative verb" has also been used for unaccusative verbs, and in most other contexts, it is used for ergative constructions.

In English
Most English verbs can be used intransitively, but ordinarily this does not change the role of the subject; consider, for example, "He ate the soup" (transitive) and "He ate" (intransitive), where the only difference is that the latter does not specify what was eaten. By contrast, with a labile verb the role of the subject changes; consider "it broke the window" (transitive) and "the window broke" (intransitive).

Labile verbs can be divided into several categories:
 Verbs suggesting a change of state — break, burst, form, heal, melt, tear, transform
 Verbs of cooking — bake, boil, cook, fry
 Verbs of movement — move, shake, sweep, turn, walk
 Verbs involving vehicles — drive, fly, reverse, run, sail

Some of these can be used intransitively in either sense: "I'm cooking the pasta" is similar to both "The pasta is cooking" (as an ergative verb) and "I'm cooking", although it is clearly more informative than either.

Unlike a passive verb, a nominalization, an infinitive, or a gerund, which allow the agent to be either excluded or included, the intransitive form of a labile verb normally requires the agent to be excluded:

 "The window was broken" or "The window was broken by the burglar."
 "[…] to break the window […]" or "[…] for the burglar to break the window […]"
 "[…] the breaking of the window […]" or "[…] the burglar's breaking of the window […]"
 "The window broke" but not "The window broke by the burglar."

The intransitive form of a labile verb can suggest that there is no agent. With some non-labile verbs, this can be achieved using the reflexive voice: He solved the problem becomes The problem was solved or The problem solved itself.

The first use of the reflexive voice can indicate the lack of an agent, but it can also be used when a specific agent is unknown. For example, the phrases "John broke the window, or maybe Jack did — at any rate, the window broke" and "John solved the problem, or maybe Jack did — at any rate, the problem was solved" both have quite naturally understandable meanings, though they are slightly idiomatic.

The second use of the reflexive voice indicates that the subject of the sentence is the causative agent; the phrase "John solved the problem, or maybe Jack did — at any rate, the problem solved itself" is literally self-contradictory, though idiomatic usage does not always follow this prescription. Accordingly, some grammarians would consider both "The window broke" and "The problem solved itself" to be examples of a distinct voice, the middle voice.

The labile verb enables not only the omission of the outside agent, but also the implication that the affected party is somehow causing the action. This can be done neutrally when the affected party can be considered an institution or corporate entity and the individual member responsible for the action is unimportant, for example "the shop closed for the day". It can also avoid assigning blame when journalists are sympathetic to a particular causative agent, as in "Eight factories have closed this year."

In Norwegian 

The labile verbs in Norwegian have one conjugation pattern for the transitive form and another for the intransitive form:

 «Nøtta knakk» (The nut cracked)
 «Jeg knekte nøtta» (I cracked the nut)

In French
French is another language that has them, developed from lack of distinguished sense in Gallo-Roman Vulgar Latin:

"Il tourne la tête." ("He turns his head.")
"Sa tête tourne." ("His head turns.")

However, note that the use of the reflexive form of the verb to express the anticausative meaning is more common.

"J'ouvre la porte." ("I open the door.")
"La porte s'ouvre." ("The door opens itself", i.e. "The door opens.")

Further, verbs analogous to English cook have even more possibilities, even allowing a causative construction to substitute for the transitive form of the verb:

"Je cuis les pâtes." ("I cook the pasta.")
"Je cuis." ("I cook", i.e. either "I cook [something]" or e.g. "It's so hot in here, I'm practically roasting.")
"Je fais cuire les pâtes." (lit., "I make cook the pasta", i.e. "I make the pasta cook", i.e. "I cook the pasta.")
"Les pâtes cuisent." ("The pasta cooks.")

In Dutch
In Dutch, labile verbs are used in a way similar to English, but they stand out as more distinct particularly in the perfect tenses.

In the present, the usage in both languages is similar, for example:
"Jan breekt zijn glas." ("John breaks his glass.")
"Het glas breekt." ("The glass breaks.")

However, there are cases where the two languages deviate. For example, the verb zinken (to sink) cannot be used transitively, nor the verb openen (to open) intransitively:
"Het schip zonk." ("The ship sank.")
Not *"De marine zonk het schip." (Unlike "The navy sank the ship.")
and
"Jan opent de deur." ("John opens the door.")
Not *"De deur opent." (Unlike "The door opens.")

In this last case, one could say: "De deur gaat open." (lit. "The door goes open"), while the former would be stated as "De marine liet het schip zinken." (lit. "The navy let the ship sink").

A difference between Dutch and English is that typically the perfect tenses of intransitives take zijn (to be) as their auxiliary rather than hebben (to have), and this extends to these verbs as well. 
present:
 "Hij breekt het glas." ("He breaks the glass")
 "Het glas breekt."  ("The glass breaks.")
perfect:
 "Hij heeft het glas gebroken" ("He has broken the glass.")
 "Het glas is gebroken."  ("The glass has broken." or "The glass is broken.")

Perfect labile innocence
Labiles are verbs of innocence, because they imply the absence of an actor who could possibly be blamed. This association is quite strong in Dutch and speakers tend to treat verbs such as forgetting and losing as ergatives in the perfect tenses even though they typically have a direct object and are really transitive verbs. It is not unusual to hear sentences such as:

Ik ben mijn boek vergeten. - I forgot my book (and it just 'happened' to me: there is no actor).
Ik ben mijn geld verloren. - I lost my money (poor me).

Something similar happens with compound verbs such as gewaarworden ('become aware (of something)'). It is a separable compound of worden ('become'), which is a typical 'process'-verb. It is usually considered a copula, rather than an ergative, but these two group of verbs are related. For example, copulas usually take to be in the perfect as well. A verb such as blijven ('stay') is used both as a copula and as an ergative and all its compounds (nablijven ('stay behind'), bijblijven ('keep up'), aanblijven ('stay on') etc.) are ergatives.

Gewaarworden can take two objects, a reflexive indirect one and one that could be called a causative object. In many languages the causative object would take a case such as the genitive, but in Dutch this is no longer the case:

Ik werd me dat gewaar - I became aware of that.

The perfect usually takes to be regardless of the objects:

Ik ben me dat niet gewaargeworden. - (roughly) I did not catch on to that.

In Hebrew
Hebrew does have a few labile verbs, due in part to calques from other languages; nonetheless, it has fewer labile verbs than English, in part because it has a fairly productive causative construction and partly distinct mediopassive constructions.

See also
 Ambitransitive verb
 Unaccusative verb
 Unergative verb

References

External links
 Ideas for Teaching Ergative Verbs to ESL Students
 Wiktionary's "English ergative verbs" category

Transitivity and valency